This is a list of schools in Bristol, England

State-funded schools

Primary schools

 Air Balloon Hill Primary School	
 Ashley Down Primary School
 Ashton Gate Primary School	
 Ashton Vale Primary School
 Avanti Gardens School	
 Avonmouth CE Primary School	
 Badock's Wood E-ACT Academy
 Bannerman Road Community Academy
 Barton Hill Academy
 Begbrook Primary Academy
 Bishop Road Primary School
 Blaise Primary School	
 Brentry Primary School
 Bridge Farm Primary School
 Bridge Learning Campus
 Broomhill Infant School
 Broomhill Junior School
 Brunel Field Primary School
 Cabot Primary School
 Cathedral Primary School
 Cheddar Grove Primary School
 Chester Park Infant School
 Chester Park Junior School
 Christ Church CE Primary School
 Compass Point Primary School
 Cotham Gardens Primary School
 The Dolphin School
 Easton CE Academy
 Elmlea Infant School
 Elmlea Junior School
 Evergreen Primary Academy
 Fair Furlong Primary School
 Fairlawn Primary School
 Filton Avenue Primary School
 Fishponds CE Academy
 Fonthill Primary School
 Four Acres Academy	
 Frome Vale Academy	
 Glenfrome Primary School
 Greenfield E-Act Primary Academy
 Hannah More Primary School
 Hareclive E-Act Academy
 Headley Park Primary School
 Henbury Court Primary Academy
 Henleaze Infant School
 Henleaze Junior School
 Hillcrest Primary School
 Holy Cross RC Primary School
 Holymead Primary School
 Horfield CE Primary School
 Hotwells Primary School
 Ilminster Avenue E-Act Academy
 The Kingfisher School
 Knowle Park Primary School
 Little Mead Primary Academy	
 Luckwell Primary School			
 May Park Primary School
 Merchants' Academy		
 Minerva Primary Academy
 Nova Primary School
 Oasis Academy Bank Leaze
 Oasis Academy Connaught
 Oasis Academy Long Cross
 Oasis Academy Marksbury Road
 Oasis Academy New Oak
 Our Lady Of The Rosary RC Primary School	
 Parson Street Primary School
 Perry Court E-Act Academy
 Redfield Educate Together Primary Academy
 St Anne's Infant School
 St Barnabas CE Primary School	
 St Bernadette RC Primary School	
 St Bernard's RC Primary School	
 St Bonaventure's RC Primary School	
 St John's CE Primary School
 St Joseph's RC Primary School	
 St Mary Redcliffe CE Primary School
 St Nicholas of Tolentine RC Primary School
 St Patrick's RC Primary School
 St Peter's CE Primary School	
 St Teresa's RC Primary School	
 St Ursula's E-Act Academy
 St Werburgh's Primary School
 Ss Peter and Paul RC Primary School
 School Of Christ The King RC Primary
 Sea Mills Primary School
 Sefton Park Infant School
 Sefton Park Junior School
 Shirehampton Primary School
 Southville Primary School
 Stoke Bishop CE Primary School
 Stoke Park Primary School
 Summerhill Academy
 Summerhill Infant School
 Two Mile Hill Primary School
 Upper Horfield Primary School
 Victoria Park Primary School
 Wansdyke Primary School
 Waycroft Academy
 West Town Lane Academy
 Westbury Park School	
 Westbury-On-Trym CE Academy
 Whitehall Primary School
 Wicklea Academy
 Willow Park CE Primary School
 Woodlands Academy

Secondary schools

Ashton Park School
Bedminster Down School
Blaise High School
Bridge Learning Campus
Bristol Brunel Academy
Bristol Cathedral Choir School
Bristol Free School
Bristol Metropolitan Academy
City Academy Bristol
Cotham School
Fairfield High School
Merchants' Academy
Montpelier High School
Oasis Academy Brightstowe
Oasis Academy Brislington
Oasis Academy John Williams
Orchard School Bristol
Redland Green School
St Bede's Catholic College
St Bernadette Catholic Secondary School
St Mary Redcliffe and Temple School
Trinity Academy, Bristol

Special and alternative schools

Briarwood School
Bristol Gateway School
Bristol Hospital Education Service
Claremont School
Elmfield School for Deaf Children
Kingsweston School
Knowle DGE Academy
Lansdown Park Academy
New Fosseway School
Notton House Academy
St Matthias Academy
Snowdon Village
Soundwell Academy
Venturers' Academy
Woodstock School

Further education
Access Creative College
City of Bristol College
North Bristol Post 16 Centre
St Brendan's Sixth Form College
South Gloucestershire and Stroud College

Independent schools

Primary and preparatory schools
Bristol Steiner School
Carmel Christian School
Cleve House School
Gracefield Preparatory School
Torwood House School

Senior and all-through schools

Badminton School
Bristol Grammar School
Bristol International College
Clifton College
Clifton High School
Colston's School
Queen Elizabeth's Hospital
Redmaids' High School

Special and alternative schools
Belgrave School
Grace Garden School
LPW Independent School

Sources 
 

Schools in Bristol
Bristol
Schools